Spare rib may mean or refer to:

Spare ribs, the food
Char siu, the more Cantonese cuisine version of spare ribs
Spare Rib, a magazine in the United Kingdom
Spare Ribs, an album by electronic punk duo Sleaford Mods